Laura Owens (born 1970) is an American painter, gallery owner and educator. She emerged in the late 1990s from the Los Angeles art scene. She is known for large-scale paintings that combine a variety of art historical references and painterly techniques. She lives and works in Los Angeles, California.

In 2013, she turned her studio work space into an exhibition space called 356 Mission, in collaboration with Gavin Brown and Wendy Yao.   The 356 Mission art space closed in 2019, due to the lease ending.

In 2003 Owens had her first survey exhibition at the Museum of Contemporary Art, Los Angeles. Owens’s work has been presented in solo exhibitions at Secession, Vienna (2015); Kunstmuseum Bonn (2011); Bonnefanten Museum (2007); Kunsthalle Zürich (2006); Camden Arts Centre, London (2006); Milwaukee Art Museum (2003); Aspen Art Museum, Colorado (2003); and the Isabella Stewart Gardner Museum, (2001). Owens had a mid-career survey at the Whitney Museum Of American Art from November 2017 to February 2018.

Early life and education 
Owens was born in 1970 in Euclid, Ohio and raised in nearby Norwalk, Ohio. She received her B.F.A. in Painting from the Rhode Island School of Design in 1992. After graduation she moved to Los Angeles for graduate school. In 1994 she attended the Skowhegan School of Painting and Sculpture and received her M.F.A. from the California Institute of the Arts the same year.

Work 
In 2015, Owens made paintings based on World War II-era newspaper stereotype plates she discovered underneath the shingle siding of her Los Angeles home. Like much of her recent work, the paintings combined traditional oil paint with screen printed images digitally manipulated in Adobe Photoshop.

In addition to painting, Owens also creates artists' books. As of 2016, she teaches classes at ArtCenter College of Design.

Owen's work can be found in many public art collections including, the Art Institute of Chicago, Chicago; the Museum of Modern Art, New York; the Museum of Contemporary Art, Los Angeles, Los Angeles; the Los Angeles County Museum of Art, Los Angeles; the Guggenheim Museum in New York, New York; the Whitney Museum of American Art, New York; the Museum of Contemporary Art, Chicago, Chicago; and the Milwaukee Art Museum, Milwaukee.

Controversy 
In January 2013, Owens exhibited 12 new paintings in a building at 356 Mission Road, across the river from Downtown Los Angeles. Owens continued to run this space, 356 Mission as an exhibition space in collaboration with Gavin Brown and Wendy Yao. In May 2018, 356 Mission closed after their 5 year lease came to an end. The bookstore Ooga Booga remains open at its original store location in Chinatown, Los Angeles.

Laura Owens and Gavin Brown have been accused of being involved with gentrification of a predominantly working-class, Hispanic neighborhood with their gallery 356 Mission in of Boyle Heights, on the east side of Los Angeles. Activists of various anti-gentrification groups have protested their galleries and exhibitions in both Los Angeles and New York City. Owens alleges protesters have bullied and threatened her, including death threats. In November 2017, she penned a public statement regarding the issues, after her mid-career survey art exhibition opening at the Whitney Museum of American Art was protested. The 356 Mission art space closed in 2019, due to the lease ending.

Awards and honors 
Owens was awarded the inaugural Bâloise Prize at Art Basel in 1999, received the Willard L. Metcalf Award in Art from the American Academy of Arts and Letters in 2001, and was a Guna S. Mundheim Visual Arts Fellow at the American Academy in Berlin in the spring of 2007. In 2015, she was awarded the Robert De Niro, Sr. prize for her painting practice.

Exhibitions

Solo exhibitions 

 2001: Isabella Stewart Gardner Museum, Boston, Massachusetts 
 2003: Museum of Contemporary Art, Los Angeles (touring)
 2003: Aspen Art Museum, Aspen, Colorado
 2003: Milwaukee Art Museum, Milwaukee, Wisconsin
 2004: The Fabric Workshop and Museum, Philadelphia
 2006: Kunsthalle Zurich, Zurich, Switzerland
 2006: Camden Arts Centre, London
 2007: Bonnefantenmuseum Maastricht, The Netherlands
 2007: American Academy studio exhibition, Berlin
 2007: Ausstellungshalle Zeitgenossische Kunst, Munster 
 2011: Kunstmuseum Bonn, Bonn, Germany
 2015: Secession, Vienna
 2016: CCA Wattis Institute for Contemporary Arts, San Francisco, California
 2017: Whitney Museum of American Art
 2018: Dallas Museum of Art (DMA)
2018: Museum of Contemporary Art, Los Angeles

Group exhibitions 

 2016: La collection Thea Westreich Wagner et Ethan Wagner, Centre Georges Pompidou, Paris

References

External links 

1970 births
20th-century American painters
20th-century American women artists
21st-century American painters
21st-century American women artists
American women painters
Bâloise Prize winners
Living people
Rhode Island School of Design alumni
California Institute of the Arts alumni
American contemporary painters